The Newcastle Sandstone is a geologic formation in Wyoming, United States. It preserves fossils dating back to the Late Cretaceous period.

Named as a member of Draneros shale of Colorado group for the town of Newcastle, Weston Co, WY in Powder River basin, where member is conspicuously developed.

Consists of reddish to light-yellow sandstone associated with black, carbonaceous shale. About 35 ft thick in vicinity of Newcastle. A Cretaceous sequence can be formed in the northern Great Plains in Williston and Powder River basins, as well as Chadron arch.

This area is classed as a formation on the westrin rim of the black hills.

See also

 List of fossiliferous stratigraphic units in Wyoming
 Paleontology in Wyoming

References

 

 Hancock, E.T., 1920, The Mule Creek oil field, Wyoming, IN Contributions to economic geology, 1920; Part 2, Mineral fuels: U.S. Geological Survey Bulletin, 716-C, p. C35-C53.

 Reeside, J.B., Jr., 1944, Maps showing thickness and general character of the Cretaceous deposits in the Western Interior of the United States: U.S. Geological Survey Oil and Gas Investigations Preliminary Map, OM-10, scale 1:13,939,200

 Cobban, W.A., and Reeside, J.B., Jr., 1952, Correlation of the Cretaceous formations of the Western Interior of the United States: Geological Society of America Bulletin, v. 63, no. 10, p. 1011-1044.

Sandstone formations of the United States
Cretaceous geology of Wyoming